Arvilla Township is a township in Grand Forks County, North Dakota, United States.

References

Townships in Grand Forks County, North Dakota
Townships in North Dakota